Edward James Nuttall (born 15 July 1993) is a fast left-arm bowler. He plays cricket for the Canterbury Kings and represented New Zealand in the 2011 ICC Under-19 Cricket World Cup. In June 2018, he was awarded a contract with Canterbury for the 2018–19 season. In June 2020, he was offered a contract by Canterbury ahead of the 2020–21 domestic cricket season.

Edward is the son of Andrew Nuttall, who also played first class cricket for Canterbury.

References

1993 births
Living people
New Zealand cricketers
Canterbury cricketers